"Dark Star" is a song released as a single by the Grateful Dead on Warner Bros. records in 1968. It was written by lyricist Robert Hunter and composed by lead guitarist Jerry Garcia; however, compositional credit is sometimes extended to include Phil Lesh, Bill Kreutzmann, Mickey Hart,  Ron "Pigpen" McKernan, and Bob Weir. "Dark Star" was an early Grateful Dead classic which the group often used as a vehicle for extended jam sessions during live performances. The song is included in The Rock and Roll Hall of Fame's 500 Songs that Shaped Rock and Roll list and was ranked at number 57 on Rolling Stone's 100 Greatest Guitar Songs of All Time.

Composition and release
In May 1967, Garcia composed the preliminary chords of the song, but it was at the time without lyrics. A handful of months later, Robert Hunter, who would become a longtime collaborator with the Grateful Dead, arrived back in California and overheard the band playing around with the track. While in Rio Nido, a small town on the Russian River just north of San Francisco, he immediately sat down and wrote the opening line, contributing the lyrics and name of the song. As Hunter has explained on multiple occasions, he reworded the opening lines of "The Love Song of J. Alfred Prufrock" as the chorus.

"Dark Star" was initially released as a single in 1968, backed with "Born Cross-Eyed", a track written by rhythm guitarist Bob Weir. The single, to quote Phil Lesh, "sank like a stone." Of the 1600 copies that made up the original shipment in 1968 by Warner Bros., only about 500 actually sold. A classic live version appeared in 1969 on Live/Dead, the Dead's first live album. It also appeared on later compilations What a Long Strange Trip It's Been in 1977 and The Best of the Grateful Dead in 2015.  It also appears as a bonus track on the 2001 reissue of Live/Dead. It also features Hunter's only appearance on a Grateful Dead record, reciting a monologue at the end of the song.

Performance history

Due to the relentless touring of the Grateful Dead, and the fact that fans were allowed to tape the band's shows, many live versions of "Dark Star" exist. The studio recording of "Dark Star" lasted only 2:40, yet the song was known for its lengthy live performances, many of which clocked in at 20–30 minutes. Running over 23 minutes (13 minutes of it consisting of Jerry Garcia's guitar solo), the popular rendition as found on the Live/Dead live album was a blend of psychedelia, jazz, and jam elements. "Dark Star" defines the Dead's early improvisational music. At Woodstock 1969 it clocked in at 19:08.

After 1973, "Dark Star" fell out of the normal rotation at Dead shows; the song was not performed at all between October 18, 1974 and December 31, 1978. Being present for a "Dark Star" performance became a "Holy Grail" for Deadheads. The song became so legendary that it was often referred to as "IT" by dedicated Heads. Knowing this, the Dead would sometimes tease the song's introduction before switching into another song, finally bringing it back in the end of the seventies on New Years 1978, at the closing of Winterland. Semi-regular guest pianist Bruce Hornsby would later incorporate such teases into his own concerts, knowing a good number of Deadheads might be in attendance.

After the New Years 1981 show "Dark Star" only appeared once more in the first half of the eighties (at the Hearst Greek Theatre on July 13, 1984) and lay dormant until revived at the "Formerly the Warlocks" two-day run at Hampton Coliseum in Hampton, Virginia on October 9, 1989. Shortly after, performing as the Grateful Dead, Dark Star returned on October 16, 1989 in a performance at the Meadowlands Arena (FKA Brendyn Byrne Arena) which later was released as "Nightfall of Diamonds," and concluded this tour with another performance at Miami on October 26, 1989, which many Heads consider the best of the tour and among the top late performances. After its 1989 revival, the song was performed frequently in 1990, and occasionally through the rest of the band's career.  Notable post-revival "Dark Stars" include performances with jazz saxophonist Branford Marsalis sitting in with the band at Nassau Coliseum in Uniondale, New York, on March 29, 1990, and Oakland Coliseum Arena on December 31, 1990; the entire Nassau show appears as the vault release Wake Up to Find Out.

In 1993, Phil Lesh approached music collage artist John Oswald to do a project with "Dark Star." He was given over a hundred different performances of the song from between 1968 and 1993. Oswald then built, layered, and "folded" these many performances to produce two large, recomposed versions, one running 59:59, and the second 46:46. The project is called Grayfolded. This is the only recording known to include performances by every member of the group, from inception in 1965 through 1995. The final live performance of "Dark Star" by the Grateful Dead occurred on March 30, 1994 at The Omni in Atlanta, Georgia.

Notable performances
During the period when the Grateful Dead were mixing their first official live album Live/Dead, the band played a run of four shows at San Francisco's Fillmore West performing and recording "Dark Star" every night and selecting the February 27, 1969 performance for inclusion on their Live/Dead album.  All four shows have been released as the  Fillmore West 1969: The Complete Recordings box set. During this period, "Dark Star" began to take thematic shape and became a cornerstone of the Dead's jamming.

Some Deadheads consider February 18, 1971's version at the Capitol Theater in Port Chester, NY to be the best. Lasting 22 minutes in length, this version of "Dark Star" flowed into the song "Wharf Rat" and then back into "Dark Star".

Another well-loved performance considered by many fans to be the peak rendition of "Dark Star" is from the Fillmore East on February 13, 1970. This performance of the song includes the "Feelin' Groovy Jam", so-called because of its passing resemblance to "The 59th Street Bridge Song (Feelin' Groovy)" by Simon and Garfunkel.  Other knowledgeable listeners favor Winterland, San Francisco, November 11, 1973 as the peak performance.  The Dead performed Dark Star ten times in their 1972 Europe tour, every performance gripping and all included in the official complete release of the tour.

In an unofficial survey of the Grateful Dead's fans, the performance most cited is the restless and tormented Veneta Oregon "Dark Star" of August 27, 1972. A list of the top ten in that "deadhead" ranking is as follows:

 August 27, 1972 (Veneta, Oregon)
 February 13, 1970 (New York City)
 February 27, 1969 (San Francisco)
 February 18, 1971 (Port Chester, NY)
 November 11, 1973 (San Francisco)
 October 31, 1971 (Columbus, Ohio)
 September 21, 1972 (Philadelphia, PA)
 April 8, 1972 (London)
 May 11, 1972 (Rotterdam)
 December 6, 1973 (Cleveland, Ohio), with a duration of over 43 minutes, about the length of Beethoven's Sixth Symphony, the performance of December 6, 1973 is the longest "Dark Star" the Grateful Dead played in concert.

Other long Dark Stars include 

 Dusseldorf April 24, 1972 (42:58 including an embedded Me & My Uncle)
 London May 25, 1972. (35:13)
 Waterbury September 24, 1972  (34:13)
 Kansas City November 13, 1972. (34:13)
 Winterland, San Francisco December 11, 1972 (32:43)
 Oklahoma City October 19, 1973  (28:49)
 Washington, D.C. July 12, 1990. (25:18)
 Madison Square Garden, New York September 20, 1990. (31:38 with a 5 minute Playin in the Band jam embedded)

References

External links
 The Encyclopedia of Science Fiction
 Dark Star catalog and evolution
 Annotated Dark Star lyrics
 

1968 songs
Grateful Dead songs
1968 singles
1977 singles
Songs with lyrics by Robert Hunter (lyricist)
Songs written by Jerry Garcia